Payel Sarkar (born 10 February 1991) is an Indian actress who has appeared in Bengali films and Hindi television. On 25 February 2021, she joined the Bharatiya Janata Party.

Political career 
Sarkar joined Bharatiya Janata Party in 2021 and is fighting in 2021 West Bengal Legislative Assembly election from Behala Purba constituency.

Filmography

Television 
 Ekdin Pratidin as Diya [2005-2007]
 Love Story  as Shruti opposite to Mishal Raheja [30 April 2007 – 17 January 2008]
 Waqt Batayega Kaun Apna Kaun Paraya as Rudra (Protagonist; also Shamli in her previous birth who was killed by her husband Jayant) [14 April 2008 – 30 October 2008]
 Shakuntala as Rajkumari Gauri [2 February 2009 – 15 May 2009]
 Ladies Special as Pooja Singh [25 May 2009 – 9 December 2009]

Web series

Awards 
 Anandalok Award, 2010 Best Actress for Le Chakka
 Kalakar Awards, 2016 Best Actress for Jomer Raja Dilo Bor

References

External links 
 
 
 

21st-century Indian actresses
Living people
Actresses from Kolkata
Indian film actresses
Actresses in Bengali cinema
Jadavpur University alumni
Indian television actresses
Bengal Film Journalists' Association Award winners
1978 births
Bharatiya Janata Party politicians from West Bengal
Indian actor-politicians